Gillingham EMUD is a train maintenance depot located in Gillingham, Kent, England. The depot is situated on the Chatham Main Line just east of Gillingham station.

The depot code is GI. 

Class 466/0s are maintained at Gillingham with 1 Class 376/0 sent to the depot every weekend for maintenance. Both Metro and Mainline trains also receive light maintenance, making the depot quite versatile.

Allocation 
As of 2020, the depot's allocation consists of Southeastern Class 465/0/1/2/9 and 466/0 Networkers, Class 375/3/6/7/8/9, Class 376/0 and Class 377/1/5 Electrostars, also Thameslink Class 700s. The depot primarily maintains Class 466/0 Networkers and Class 376/0 Metro Electrostars.

References 

 Railway depots in England
Rail transport in Kent